The turquoise-browed motmot (Eumomota superciliosa) is a colourful, medium-sized bird of the motmot family, Momotidae. It inhabits Central America from south-east Mexico (mostly the Yucatán Peninsula), to Costa Rica, where it is common and not considered threatened. It lives in fairly open habitats such as forest edge, gallery forest and scrubland. It is more conspicuous than other motmots, often perching in the open on wires and fences. From these perches it scans for prey, such as insects and small reptiles. White eggs (3–6) are laid in a long tunnel nest in an earth bank or sometimes in a quarry or fresh-water well. Its name originates from the turquoise color of its brow. It is the national bird of both El Salvador and Nicaragua, where it is known as torogoz and guardabarranco respectively.

It has a mostly grey-blue body with a rufous back and belly. There is a bright blue strip above the eye and a blue-bordered black patch on the throat. The flight feathers and upperside of the tail are blue. The tips of the tail feathers are shaped like rackets and the bare feather shafts are longer than in other motmots. Although it is often said that motmots pluck the barbs off their tail to create the racketed shape, this is not true; the barbs are weakly attached and fall off due to abrasion with substrates and with routine preening.

Unlike most bird species, where only males express elaborate traits, the turquoise-browed motmot expresses the extraordinary racketed tail in both sexes. Research indicates that the tail has evolved to function differently for the sexes. Males apparently use their tail as a sexual signal, as males with longer tails have greater pairing success and reproductive success. In addition to this function, the tail is used by both sexes in a wag-display, whereby the tail is moved back-and-forth in a pendulous fashion. The wag-display is performed in a context unrelated to mating: both sexes perform the wag-display in the presence of a predator, and the display is thought to confer naturally selected benefits by communicating to the predator that it has been seen and that pursuit will not result in capture. This form of interspecific communication is referred to as a pursuit-deterrent signal.

The call is nasal, croaking and far-carrying.

The turquoise-browed motmot is a well-known bird in its range. It has acquired a number of local names including guardabarranco ("ravine-guard") in Nicaragua, torogoz in El Salvador (based on its call) and pájaro reloj ("clock bird") in the Yucatán, based on its habit of wagging its tail like a pendulum. In Costa Rica it is known as momoto cejiceleste or the far-less flattering pájaro bobo ("foolish bird"), owing to its tendency to allow humans to come very near it without flying away.

Gallery

References

External links

 Turquoise-browed Motmot research by Troy G. Murphy at Trinity University, Texas
 Stamps (for El Salvador, Honduras, Mexico, Nicaragua, and Panama) at bird-stamps.org
 
 
 Turquoise-browed motmot in Laguna de Apoyo Nature Reserve, Nicaragua
 
 

turquoise-browed motmot
National symbols of El Salvador
National symbols of Nicaragua
Birds of Central America
Birds of Mexico
Birds of the Yucatán Peninsula
Birds of El Salvador
Birds of Guatemala
Birds of Honduras
Birds of Nicaragua
Birds of Costa Rica
turquoise-browed motmot